Adolf Hitler: My Part in His Downfall is a 1973 British comedy film adaptation of the first volume of Spike Milligan's autobiography. It stars Jim Dale as the young Terence "Spike" Milligan, while Milligan himself plays the part of his father, Leo. Dale was nominated for the BAFTA Award for Most Promising Newcomer to Leading Film Roles for his performance.

Outline
The film is based on the first volume of Milligan's war memoirs. Although it broadly follows Milligan's book, some scenes were created specifically for the film and all of the character names (apart from the Milligan family) are fictional.

Aspiring jazz musician Terence "Spike" Milligan reluctantly obeys his call-up and joins the Royal Artillery regiment at Bexhill-on-Sea, where he begins training to take part in World War II. But along the way Spike and his friends get involved in many amusing - and some not-so amusing - scrapes.

Cast
 Jim Dale as Spike Milligan
 Arthur Lowe as Major Drysdale
 Bill Maynard as Sergeant Ellis
 Tony Selby as Bill
 Geoffrey Hughes as Larry
 Jim Norton as Pongo
 John Forgeham as Wally
 Windsor Davies as Sergeant McKay
 Spike Milligan as Leo Milligan (Spike's father)
 Pat Coombs as Florence Milligan (Spike's mother)
 Bob Todd as Bill Thompson, the Referee at the boxing bout
 Gregory Phillips as Desmond Milligan (Spike's brother)
 Alvar Liddell as himself (news broadcaster)
 Robert Longden as Heavenly Bliss

References

External links

1973 films
1973 comedy films
British war films
Films based on autobiographies
Films directed by Norman Cohen
Films set in 1940
Works by Spike Milligan
British World War II films
1970s English-language films
1973 war films
1970s British films